Stary Solec  is a village in the administrative district of Gmina Szydłów, within Staszów County, Świętokrzyskie Voivodeship, in south-central Poland.

The village has a population of  385.

Demography 
According to the 2002 Poland census, there were 402 people residing in Stary Solec village, of whom 49.8% were male and 50.2% were female. In the village, the population was spread out, with 27.6% under the age of 18, 37.3% from 18 to 44, 14.2% from 45 to 64, and 20.9% who were 65 years of age or older.
 Figure 1. Population pyramid of village in 2002 — by age group and sex

References

See also
 The Lesser Polish Way

Stary Solec